Sardar Amjad Hossain was a Jatiya Party (Ershad) politician and the former Member of Parliament of Rajshahi-3.

Early life
Hossain was born on 1 January 1940 in Hamirkutsa village, Bagmara Upazila, Rajshahi District.

Career
Hossain was elected to the National Assembly of Pakistan in 1970 on an Awami League nomination. In 1975, he served as the organising secretary of BAKSAL. He joined Jatiya Party in 1986. He was elected to parliament from Rajshahi-3 as a Jatiya Party candidate in 1986 and 1988. He served as the Minister of Land, the Minister of Food, Minister of Agriculture, and the Minister of fisheries and livestock in the Cabinet of Hussain Mohammad Ershad. He campaigned for Ershad's release after he was removed from power and imprisoned. He returned to Bangladesh Awami League in 2005.

Death
Hossain died on 19 December 2015 in Apollo Hospital, Dhaka, Bangladesh.

References

Jatiya Party politicians
Awami League politicians
1940 births
2015 deaths
3rd Jatiya Sangsad members
4th Jatiya Sangsad members
Food ministers of Bangladesh
Agriculture ministers of Bangladesh
Land ministers of Bangladesh
Fisheries and Livestock ministers of Bangladesh